Tephritis nigricauda is a species of tephritid or fruit flies in the genus Tephritis of the family Tephritidae.

Distribution
Europe.

References

Tephritinae
Insects described in 1856
Diptera of Europe